William Wynne ( – 1855) was an Irish  politician.

He sat in the House of Commons of Ireland from 1799 to 1800, as a Member of Parliament for 
Sligo Borough.

References 
 

1764 births
Year of birth uncertain
1855 deaths
Members of the Parliament of Ireland (pre-1801) for County Sligo constituencies
Irish MPs 1798–1800